Tatau is a town, and the capital of the Tatau District (4,945.8 square kilometres) in Bintulu Division, Sarawak, Malaysia. The district's reported total population for Tatau (year 2010 census) was 30,383. Tatau became a district in 1987. Before that it was a Sub District under Bintulu District. The main spoken languages are Iban, Kenyah, Beketan and Punan.

Education

Secondary school
SMK Tatau

Primary school
SK Tatau
SJK(C) Chung Hua Tatau
SK Ulu Kakus
SK Tatau
SK Sungai Bagiau
SK Sangan Iban
SK Rumah Keseng
SK Rh Tayai
SK Ng Tau
SK Ng Penyarai
SK Kuala Tatau
SK Kuala Serupai
SK Kuala Annau
SK Kelawit
SK Nanga Tau
SK Nanga Muput
SK Rumah Barrau

Pan Borneo Highway project
As the part of the Pan Borneo Highway, Tatau is put into works package contract (WPC09) from Sg. Arip Bridge to Bintulu Airport Junction. The main proposal is upgrading the existing road from two way lane to four way two lane and constructing a new parallel bridges alongside of the project, including the main Batang Tatau Bridge. It was taken by the turnkey contractor, Lebuhraya Borneo Utara (LBU) Sdn Bhd and the main contractor of this WPC is KKBWCT Joint Venture Sdn Bhd.

Transport

Local bus

Climate
Tatau has a tropical rainforest climate (Af) with heavy to very heavy rainfall year-round.

References 

Tatau District
Towns in Sarawak